This is a list of presidents of the New York Stock Exchange.

References

External links
Presidents and Chairmen of the New York Stock Exchange (PDF)

New York Stock Exchange
New York Stock Exchange
History of stock exchanges in the United States
Presidents of the New York Stock Exchange